Papuacola is a genus of moths of the family Erebidae. The genus was erected by George Hampson in 1926.

Species
Papuacola albisigillata (Warren, 1903) New Guinea, Sulawesi, Sumatra, Borneo
Papuacola costalis (Moore, 1883) Andamans, Java, Sumatra, Borneo, Moluccas, New Guinea, Queensland, Bismarcks, Solomons, Fiji, Rotuma, New Caledonia, Samoa
Papuacola gemina (Fabricius, 1794) India, Peninsular Malaysia, Sumatra, Bali, Borneo, Sulawesi, New Guinea

References

Calpinae